Mehdi Vaez-Iravani is an Iranian scientist, engineer and inventor involved in the invention of Shear-force microscopy.

Mehdi Vaez-Iravani graduated with a PhD in Electrical engineering from University College London and became a faculty member at Rochester Institute of Technology before joining KLA Tencor.

He has numerous patents and scientific publications in optics, optical engineering and related areas. He attended Alborz High School in Tehran, Iran from 1971 to 1975.

Selected bibliography

References

Iranian electrical engineers
Year of birth missing (living people)
Living people